The Order of World Scouts (OWS), founded in 1911, is the oldest international Scouting organisation. It is headquartered in England, with the administration headquarters in Italy. 

As of November 2008, the Order of World Scouts includes member associations in 14 countries – the United Kingdom, Italy, Australia, Peru, Jamaica, as well as two associations each for Poland, Argentina, Uruguay, Chile, the Dominican Republic, Bolivia, Brasil, Chile and three associations in Mexico, Ukraine and Nepal, Uganda, Honduras and the United States (United States Trailblazers).

History
The Order of World Scouts was formed by Sir Francis Vane upon the British Boy Scouts which had spread across the British Empire and the National Peace Scouts. The British Boy Scouts were formed in 1908 as the Battersea Boy Scouts. The Battersea Boy Scouts briefly registered with The Baden-Powell Boy Scouts in September 1908 but withdrew out of a concern that Baden-Powell's organisation was too bureaucratic and militaristic. The Battersea Boy Scouts (BBS) were reconstituted as the British Boy Scouts (BBS) and launched as a national organisation in March 1909.

Sir Francis Vane had been the Baden-Powell Boy Scouts London Commissioner.  He felt that Scouting should be non-military and pushed for the Baden-Powell Boy Scouts to be a more democratic organization. Through mediation, Vane reconciled the British Boy Scouts with the Baden-Powell Boy Scouts by having the British Boy Scouts as an affiliated organisation. However, Baden-Powell appointed members of the National Service League, a pro-military group to his Boy Scouts Headquarters and Vane's position was eliminated. In a protest meeting, the London area Scoutmasters voted overwhelmingly in support of Sir Francis. Baden-Powell promised to reinstate Sir Francis but never did.

On December 3, 1909, Sir Francis Vane accepted the presidency of the British Boy Scouts taking most London area Troops with him. The Quakers' Birmingham and Midland Troops also followed. Vane was instrumental in gaining Quakers to sponsor Scout Troops, with support given by George and Barrow Cadbury. Discussions with the pacifist Boy's Life Brigade led to the creation of the National Peace Scouts, launched on 1 April 1910. The Order of World Scouts was an international extension of these efforts.

With Vane having an Italian summer home, he and his co-founder Remo Molinari were able to launch the Scouting Movement in Italy with the Italian Boy Scouts (Ragazzi Esploratori Italiani) in 1910.

In 1911, in France, Vane assisted Augustin Dufresne, a ship owner, to organise a French Scouting organisation.

With the spread of the British Boy Scouts program throughout the world via the CHUMS (paper)  and Vane's efforts, Vane aligned the various national Scout organisations as the "Legion of World Scouts", the first international organization, launched on 1 May 1911. This included the 'American Boy Scout'. The relationship with the American Boy Scout was short lived due to its overt militarism.

Vane then launched The Order of World Scouts on 11 November 1911. This day was influenced by the French, as it was the day that Baldwin was crowned King of Jerusalem, on 11 November 1100 (St Martin's Day).  Vane became the Grand Scoutmaster of the Order of World Scouts.

Representation covered fifteen countries (counting Ireland as being separate) being; the UK, Ireland, Italy, the United States (isolated troops), Canada, France, Belgium, India, South America, China, South Africa, Canada, Egypt, Australia and New Zealand.

Vane put his wealth behind the World Scouts, BBS and other national Scout organisations: providing a London headquarters and financing the organisations, even the manufacture of Scout uniforms not only for the BBS, but also for the Italian Scouts.  This over-burdened his finances to the point of having to declare bankruptcy.  Thus the Order of World Scouts and BBS lost their headquarters, source of equipment and uniforms, and their leader, Sir Francis Vane.

The World Scouts was left with member troops in England (remaining to the present), and in Australia. The Australian BBS, proved more resilient than was initially thought. The 4th Alexandria (Australia) British Boy Scouts existed in the 1950s, and possibly beyond that date, Individual members in Australia corresponded with the British Chief Commissioner up until the late 1960s. Robert Campbell, an Australian Scout researcher, traced the BBS in Australia and credits the continuation of membership in Australia to the 1990s, when the Scouts of Australia became the successors to the BBS, which "Ceased activity in Australia c1950s but retains members".

In the mid-1980s expansion began again with members joining in Hawaii (USA). In the early 1990s, contact was made by a Scouting organisation in Australia, followed by Scouting organisations in other countries.

After contact in 1991 with the Independent Scouts of Australia Incorporated, the Order was more formally organised with the appointments of a BBS Commissioner for Australia in 1991 and a Chief Commissioner of BBS & BGS in Canada in 1999.

List of members

Grand Scoutmasters and other officers 
Grand Scoutmasters
Sir Francis Vane (1911–1912)
Albert Jones Knighton (1913–1926)
Rt Hon Lord Alington (1926–1932)
Samuel Nalty Manning (1932–1967)
Percy Herbert Pooley in-charge (1967–1971)
Charles A Brown in-charge (1971–1983)
Charles A Brown (1983–1992)
Edward E Scott (1993–2000)
Rev'd Michael John Foster (2000–2016)
David Cooksely (2016–)

President
Colonel Frederick Charles Keyser 1909
Sir Francis Vane bt 1909–1913

Vice President
Prince Di Cassano of Italy

Honorary President
Mrs G White Brebble 1932
Viscount Milton 1939
The Rt Hon The Earl of Fitzwilliam 1948
The Reverend Bill Dowling 1997

Assistant Grand Scoutmaster, Britain
Captain Masterman 1911–1912
L C Hobbs 1914–1926

Assistant Grand Scoutmaster, South Australia
Joseph Regis-Coory 1911–1914

Assistant Grand Scoutmaster, South Africa
H C Edwards-Carter 1911–1914

Assistant Grand Scoutmaster, France
Monsieur Augustin Dufresne 1911–1914

Assistant Grand Scoutmaster, Italy
Ivano Venerandi 2007–

Assistant Grand Scoutmaster, Poland
 Jerzy Gach 2009–

Assistant Grand Scoutmaster, Latinoamericana
Francisco Arias 2017–

Chief Commissioner for Britain
W G Whitby 1909–1911
Percy Herbert Pooley 1926–1971
Charles A Brown 1971–1983
Rev'd Michael John Foster 1983–2000
David Cooksely 2000–2017
Paul Stevens 2017–

Chief Commissioner for Australia
Robert Campbell 1991–2001

Chief Commissioner for Canada
Bill Nangle 1999 Resigned

Chief Commissioner for Italy
Ivano Venerandi 2006–2007

Chief Commissioner for Poland
Jerzy Gach 2002–2008

Chief Commissioner for Argentina
Osvaldo Fonseca 2008–2016
Gabriel Palma 2017–

Chief Commissioner for Bolivia
Rolando Farfan 2008–2016

Chief Commissioner for Brasil
Salvio Avenor 2008–2016

Chief Commissioner for Chile
Marcelo Vergara 2008–2016

Chief Commissioner for Republica Dominicana
Roberto Torres 2008–2016

Chief Commissioner for Jamaica
Lavinia McClure 2009–

Chief Commissioner for El Salvador
 Francisco Arias 2016

Chief Commissioner for Mexico
Juventino Sandoval 2009–2011
Miguel Chi 2017–

Chief Commissioner for Peru
Josè Luis Duffoò Cornejo 2008–2016

Chief Commissioner for Ukrain
Aleksander Matsiyevskyy 2009–

Chief Commissioner for Uruguay
Jorge Villaran 2008–2016

Chief Commissioner for Ecuador
Eduardo José Mera Alay 2010–2014

Chief Commissioner for Nepal
Sudhan Maraseni 2016–present

Italian Boy Scouts

Italian Boy Scouts (IBS) was the first Scouting association in Italy founded by Francis Vane and Remo Molinari lasting from 1910 to 1914.  While short lasting, its existence influenced others to start other Scouting organizations in Italy.

History

 
Francis Vane's winter home was in Bagni di Lucca, Italy in the Apennine Mountains.  Vane started a troop at a local school which spread the ideals of the Scouting movement and the backing of the Catholic Church.  On July 12, 1910, an official launch of the Italian Boy Scouts at the Lawn Tennis Club in Bagni, followed with a royal inspection on November 6, 1910 at by King Victor Emmanuel with the co-founders of a troop of 30 boys. The royal inspection led to the patronage of the Italy King for the organization with the King becoming president of the Italian movement.  For Rome organizer, Prince Di Cassano was appointed to the position.  Initially, the REI had a long 10-point Scout Oath, but was replaced in 1911 with a shorter 9-point oath.

With World War I and other absence of Vane, the IBS ended in 1914 with many of the troops joining the National Explorers Youth Corps.

Symbols

The National Peace Scout Lily badge was initial used by Vane for the Italian Scouts plus a variant with "Be Prepared" beneath the lily for the Bagni troop. This was soon replaced by an Italian overly ornate lily. Being too ornate, this was replaced by a stone lily in the Lanaivoli Fiorenti Chapel in the Church of Corpoazioni Medioevali di S. Agostino found by a Scout.

See also 
 The Scouting Portal

Notes

References

External links
 Order of World Scouts archived pages
 The British Boy Scouts and British Girl Scouts Association
 homepage Organization of Ukrainian Scouts (Ukraine) 
 Agrupacion de Escultismo Woodcraft de Chile (Woodcraft Chile)

Non-aligned Scouting organizations
International Scouting organizations
Youth organizations established in 1911